John Edward Freeman (January 24, 1901 – April 14, 1958) was an American baseball player.

Freeman was a reserve outfielder in Major League Baseball who played briefly for the Boston Red Sox during the 1927 season. A native of Boston, Massachusetts, he was signed out of the College of the Holy Cross.
 
Freeman went hitless in two at-bats in four games. As a defensive replacement, he played three games at center field (2) and left field (1) and did not have a fielding chance.

Freeman died in Washington, D.C., at age 57.

Sources
, or Retrosheet, or SABR Biography Project

1901 births
1958 deaths
Atlanta Crackers players
Baseball players from Boston
Boston Red Sox players
Holy Cross Crusaders baseball players
Major League Baseball outfielders